Tom Mandel may refer to:

 Tom Mandel (futurist) (1946–1995), American futurist and author
 Tom Mandel (poet) (born 1942), American poet
 Tommy Mandel (born 1949), American keyboardist

See also
 Thomas Mandl (born 1979), Austrian football goalkeeper